Leźno is a non-operational PKP railway station in Leźno (Pomeranian Voivodeship), Poland.

Lines crossing the station

References 
Leźno article at Polish stations database. Retrieved 20 April 2014.

Railway stations in Pomeranian Voivodeship
Disused railway stations in Pomeranian Voivodeship
Kartuzy County